Tonic is a live album by experimental jazz fusion trio Medeski Martin & Wood recorded at Tonic in New York City from March 16–20 and 23–26, 1999. Medeski Martin & Wood played their first live performance at Tonic on July 4, 1998, not long after the club opened in the Spring of 1998. Like their first album, Notes from the Underground, Tonic was recorded in their original acoustic format: piano, bass and drums. This format was replaced by electric alternatives brought about by the restrictions of touring during the early 1990s. The setting and format of Tonic is reminiscent of Medeski Martin & Wood's acoustic roots. The live performance was conducted in front of a 150-person audience that almost surrounded the musicians.

Track listing

Personnel
John Medeski – piano, melodica
Billy Martin – drums, percussion, mbira
Chris Wood – bass

Credits
Recorded live by Federico Cribiore
Prepared for mastering by David Baker and Mark Wilder
Mastered at Sony Mastering by Mark Wilder
Project manager: Mantis Evar 
Inlay photo: Melissa Carusa
Art direction and design: Chippy

About David Baker (1945-2004)
(Sound engineer)
"A glance at his recordings reveals a phenomenal number of late-night favorites: Chico Hamilton: Still Sensitive, Paul Bley and Gary Peacock: Partners, Shirley Horn: Here's To Life, Astor Piazzolla: Rough Dancer and the Cyclical Night, Richie Beirach Trio: Trust, Anthony Davis: Hidden Voices, and, of course, pretty much anything by Medeski, Martin & Wood".

References 

2000 live albums
Medeski Martin & Wood live albums
Blue Note Records live albums